Chreso University (CU) is a non-profit private higher-education institution located in the urban setting of the metropolis of Lusaka, Zambia. Established in 2010, this institution also has a branch campus in Ndola. Officially recognized by the Ministry of Higher Education of Zambia, Chreso University (CU) is a small (uniRank enrollment range: 2,000-2,999 students) coeducational Zambian higher education institution. Chreso University offers courses and programs leading to officially recognized higher education degrees such as pre-bachelor's degrees (i.e. certificates, diplomas, associate or foundation), bachelor's degrees, master's degrees, doctorate degrees in several areas of study. This institution has a selective admission policy based on students' past academic records. The admission rate range is 50-60% making this Zambian higher education organization a averagely selective institution. International applicants are eligible to apply for enrollment. CU also provides several academic and non-academic facilities and services to students including a library, housing, sports facilities, financial aids and/or scholarships, study abroad and exchange programs, online courses and distance learning opportunities, as well as administrative services.

Campus 
Its main campus, the City Campus, is in Lusaka along the Nangwenya Road, about 6 km from the CBD. It also has the Makeni Campus about 55 km south of Lusaka (near Nampundwe) and another one in Ndola the Ndola Campus.
Chreso University delivers its full-time studies at these three locations:
 Business
 Education
 Social sciences
 Health sciences
 Hospitality

Organisation
The university is divided into the following faculties:

References

Universities in Zambia
Educational institutions established in 2010
2010 establishments in Zambia